is a Japanese restaurant chain serving gyōza and other food from Japanese Chinese cuisine. There are over 700 Ohsho restaurants in Japan. Ohsho restaurants may be either owned and operated by the parent company or franchises operated by independent owners. All will offer the standardized Ohsho Grand Menu along with individually created set menus particular to that location. Stamp card campaigns allow patrons to collect stamps for every visit, with one stamp being given for every 500 yen spent. Completed stamp cards can be exchanged for Ohsho Member Cards, valid until the end of the year, which offer either a five percent or seven percent discount on every bill. After an unsuccessful venture in China, Ohsho established an overseas presence by opening a store in Kaohsiung, Taiwan in 2017.

Incident

References

External links

 Official website (in English)
 OHSHO FOOD SERVICE Financial Statements

Fast-food chains of Japan
1967 establishments in Japan